T, or t, is the twentieth letter in the Latin alphabet, used in the modern English alphabet, the alphabets of other western European languages and others worldwide. Its name in English is tee (pronounced ), plural tees. It is derived from the Semitic Taw 𐤕 of the Phoenician and Paleo-Hebrew script (Aramaic and Hebrew Taw ת/𐡕/, Syriac Taw ܬ, and Arabic ت Tāʼ) via the Greek letter τ (tau). In English, it is most commonly used to represent the voiceless alveolar plosive, a sound it also denotes in the International Phonetic Alphabet. It is the most commonly used consonant and the second-most commonly used letter in English-language texts.

History

Taw was the last letter of the Western Semitic and Hebrew alphabets. The sound value of Semitic Taw, Greek alphabet Tαυ (Tau), Old Italic and Latin T has remained fairly constant, representing  in each of these; and it has also kept its original basic shape in most of these alphabets.

Use in writing systems

English
In English,  usually denotes the voiceless alveolar plosive (International Phonetic Alphabet and X-SAMPA), as in tart, tee, or ties, often with aspiration at the beginnings of words or before stressed vowels.

The digraph  often corresponds to the sound  (a voiceless palato-alveolar sibilant) word-medially when followed by a vowel, as in nation, ratio, negotiation, and Croatia.

The letter  corresponds to the affricate  in some words as a result of yod-coalescence (for example, in words ending in "-ture", such as future).

In a few words of modern French origin, the letter T is silent at the end of a word; these include croquet and debut.

Other languages

Other systems
In the International Phonetic Alphabet,  denotes the voiceless alveolar plosive.

Related characters

Descendants and related characters in the Latin alphabet

T with diacritics: Ť ť Ṫ ṫ ẗ Ţ ţ Ṭ ṭ Ʈ ʈ Ț ț ƫ Ṱ ṱ Ṯ ṯ Ŧ ŧ Ⱦ ⱦ Ƭ ƭ ᵵ ᶵ
Ꞇ ꞇ : Insular T, also used by William Pryce to designate the voiceless dental fricative [θ]
ᫎ : Combining small insular t was used in the Ormulum
  : Turned small t is used in the International Phonetic Alphabet (IPA)
𐞯 : Modifier letter small t with retroflex hook is a superscript IPA letter
𝼉 : Latin small letter t with hook and retroflex hook is a symbol for a voiceless retroflex implosive
𝼍 : Latin small turned t with curl is a click letter
Uralic Phonetic Alphabet-specific symbols related to T:

ₜ : Subscript small t was used in the Uralic Phonetic Alphabet prior to its formal standardization in 1902
ȶ : T with curl is used in Sino-Tibetanist linguistics
Ʇ ʇ : Turned capital T and turned small t were used in transcriptions of the Dakota language in publications of the American Board of Ethnology in the late 19th century
𝼪 : Small t with mid-height left hook was used by the British and Foreign Bible Society in the early 20th century for romanization of the Malayalam language.

Ancestors and siblings in other alphabets
𐤕 : Semitic letter Taw, from which the following symbols originally derive
Τ τ : Greek letter Tau
 : Coptic letter Taw, which derives from Greek Tau
Т т : Cyrillic letter Te, also derived from Tau
 : Gothic letter tius, which derives from Greek Tau
𐌕 : Old Italic T, which derives from Greek Tau, and is the ancestor of modern Latin T
 : Runic letter teiwaz, which probably derives from old Italic T
ፐ : One of the  26 consonantal letters of Ge'ez script. The Ge'ez abugida developed under the influence of Christian scripture by adding obligatory vocalic diacritics to the consonantal letters. Pesa ፐ is based on Tawe ተ.

Derived signs, symbols and abbreviations
™ : Trademark symbol
₮ : Mongolian tögrög
₸ : Kazakhstani tenge
৳ : Bangladeshi taka

Computing codes

 1

Other representations

Explanatory notes

References

External links

ISO basic Latin letters
Cross symbols